Irob (ኢሮብ) may refer to:

Irob people, an ethnic group of Ethiopia
Irob (woreda), a district in Ethiopia named after the people
Rob (TV series), ¡Rob!, television series